Global Satellite Technology Services (formerly known as First United Broadcasting Corporation) is a broadcast radio and television company in the Philippines. Its original station FUBC TV-9 in Zamboanga was an affiliate of BBC from 1974 to 1986, ABS-CBN in 1986–1994 and GMA Network from 1995 until April 1996.

Currently, GSTS owns a satellite television service G Sat and a free-to-air/cable news channel Golden Nation Network, which is also available in the company's UHF stations.

History

Early years
First United Broadcasting Corporation was founded by Ma. Clara "Caling" L. Lobregat, Zamboanga City's first ever female city mayor, and Basilio "Bong" Apolinario II. It brought to Zamboanga City its first FM station and its first color television station in 1977. The television station, DXLA 9Alive, was characterized by 9 "lovely" ladies. This network has produced several media personalities such as Cathy Veloso Santillan (one of the original 9Alive Girls who became a broadcaster and NewsWatch anchor of RPN-9 in the early 1990s), Zamboanga City District II Congressman Erico Basilio "Erbie" Fabian and ABS-CBN Correspondent for Western Mindanao and former anchor Pal Marquez, all of whom began their careers as part of the channel's news division.

Later years
In 1995, its original TV station, VHF channel 9 in Zamboanga city was sold to GMA. Its FM station, DXLA-FM 99.5 MHz, and AM station, DXRH-AM 1080 kHz have moved to Basilan/ARMM. However, its present goal seems to reinvent itself in the UHF spectrum nationwide.

FUBC has reinvented its image and now operates one of the Philippines' Direct-To-Home (DTH) Satellite Networks called G Sat and one of the Philippines' all news channel in cable and now in terrestrial networks called Global News Network, which is currently known as Golden Nation Network.

In the 2000s, a group of broadcast investors led by Global Destiny Cable (now Destiny Cable) then-executive Philip J. Chien acquired the franchise, ownership and management of FUBC.

In 2014, it partnered with Newtec to launch a broadband service called iGSat Satellite Broadband.

In 2018, FUBC merged with Global Broadcasting and Multimedia Inc. into a single entity and changed its name to Global Satellite Technology Services Inc.

On July 30, 2020, Philippine President Rodrigo Duterte signed Republic Act No. 11481 which renewed GSTS's license for another 25 years. The law granted GSTS a franchise to construct, install, operate, and maintain, for commercial purposes, radio broadcasting stations and television stations, including digital television system, with the corresponding facilities such as relay stations, throughout the Philippines.

On June 23, 2021, GSTS inaugurated its own Technical facilities and Earth station at the new First Global Technopark complex in Ulong Tubig, Barangay Maduya, Carmona, Cavite.

TV stations

Owned and operated stations

Analog

Digital

Digital affiliate stations

Affiliations
ABS-CBN
GMA Network
Voice of America
One Media Network

References

Television networks in the Philippines
Mass media companies established in 1977
ABS-CBN Corporation
GMA Network (company)